Monarch is a narrow gauge steam locomotive, built by W.G. Bagnall Ltd., Stafford in 1953. It is currently on public display at the Welshpool and Llanfair Light Railway. It is the last industrial narrow gauge locomotive to be built for commercial use in the UK and is constructed to a modified Meyer articulated design. It is the last of seven locomotives built to a similar design, the other six being built to  gauge and delivered to sugar estates in South Africa.

Design 
The Meyer design for articulated locomotives uses two swivelling power bogies, with the boiler, water and coal supplies on a rigid frame above this, similar to how most large diesel or electric locomotives are now constructed.

A drawback to the Meyer design is the limited space between the bogies for the firebox. Bagnall avoided this with their modified design by using the Bagnall boiler, which they already used for small contractor's locos. This has a cylindrical rear drum, with a cylindrical firebox and ashpan within this. None of the firebox or ashpan needs to protrude below footplate level, avoiding interference with the rear bogie.

History

Sittingbourne Paper Mills 

The engine was built to work on the Bowaters Paper Railway in Sittingbourne, now the Sittingbourne and Kemsley Light Railway in 1953 by W.G. Bagnall (works number 3024). Monarch was delivered on 31 July 1953 and worked for a mere 13 years until being purchased by the Welshpool and Llanfair Light Railway in 1966.

Welshpool and Llanfair Railway (first time) 

When Monarch arrived it required considerable overhaul. When the locomotive was finally overhauled, it proved less useful than was hoped. It was found difficult to drive, in particular crews of the time found it difficult to adapt to its marine-style firebox, and proved challenging on the steep gradients of the line. By 1992, the Welshpool and Llanfair Light Railway had acquired more locomotives and Monarch became surplus to requirements and was sold to the Ffestiniog Railway.

Ffestiniog Railway 

The Ffestiniog Railway bought Monarch with the intention of overhauling and cutting down the size of the engine for use on the narrower (2 ft gauge) railway. The engine was dismantled for this purpose but then priorities changed, and despite later thoughts of using it on the Welsh Highland Railway the loco was left in parts whilst it slowly rusted. The locomotive was then repurchased by the Welshpool and Llanfair Light Railway.

Welshpool and Llanfair Railway (second time) 

Monarch was bought with no intention of being used on the railway, since previously it had proved less useful than other engines, but was instead bought as a display piece and has been cosmetically restored for display at Welshpool.

References

Bibliography 
  
 
 
 

Welshpool and Llanfair Light Railway
Individual locomotives of Great Britain
Preserved narrow gauge steam locomotives of Great Britain
Railway locomotives introduced in 1953
2 ft 6 in gauge locomotives
Bagnall locomotives